Pierretta (minor planet designation: 312 Pierretta) (A891 QA) is a 46 km main-belt asteroid discovered on 28 Aug 1891 by Auguste Charlois at Nice.

References

External links 
 
 

000312
Discoveries by Auguste Charlois
Named minor planets
000312
000312
18910828